Pizzo Paglia is a mountain of the Lepontine Alps, overlooking the Val Cama in the canton of Graubünden. The border with Italy runs 300 metres south of the summit.

See also
List of mountains of Graubünden
List of most isolated mountains of Switzerland

References

External links
 Pizzo Paglia on Hikr

Mountains of the Alps
Mountains of Graubünden
Lepontine Alps
Mountains partially in Italy
Mountains of Switzerland
Grono
Cama, Switzerland